Nestor Adrián Fernández Palacios (born 4 August 1992) is a Paraguayan professional footballer who plays as a forward.

Clubs
 Independiente 2013–2014
 Quilmes 2014–2015

References
 
 

1992 births
Living people
Paraguayan footballers
Association football forwards
Club Atlético Independiente footballers
Quilmes Atlético Club footballers
Argentine Primera División players
Paraguayan expatriate footballers
Paraguayan expatriate sportspeople in Argentina
Expatriate footballers in Argentina